Sytten (English title: Eric Soya's "17") is a 1965 Danish coming-of-age sex comedy directed by Annelise Meineche and starring Ole Søltoft and Ghita Nørby. Søltoft plays a 17-year-old high school student who discovers the youthful excesses of sexual desire during his summer vacation in 1913. Based upon the semi-autobiographical 1953 novel by Carl Erik Soya, Sytten was a financial success for the Palladium Film company and ushered in a wave of erotic films such as the Bedside-films and Zodiac-films, most of which starred Søltoft.

Plot
In the summer of 1913, 17-year-old Jacob (Ole Soltoft), a Danish high school student, lives in the frustrating limbo between boyhood and manhood. He worries about his excessive focus on masturbation and, although he is aware of the sexual overtures by the housemaid Sophie (Lise Rosendahl), Jacob doesn't know how to respond to her. Jacob is invited to spend his vacation at the summer house of his wealthy uncle (Ole Monty). At the summer house in an idyllic coastal town, Jacob meets his uncle, aunt (Bodil Steen), free-spirited housemaid Hansigne (Susanne Heinrich), virginal housekeeper Rosegod (Lily Broberg), and his dream-girl cousin Vibeke (Ghita Nørby). He is also pursued by his Uncle's employee (Ingolf David), who tries to seduce Jacob. While the Uncle is off on a fishing trip and the Aunt spends the night in town with her lover, Jacob has his first sexual experience with Vibeke—an awkward encounter. Afterwards, when Vibeke leaves for school, Jacob spends his nights with Hansigne—a joyful, uncomplicated and liberated woman. She guides him through his awkwardness and teaches him erotic techniques. One night, Hansigne's boyfriend Knud (Hugo Herrestrup) catches them together and attacks and threatens Jacob. Jacob discovers he finally feels like a man. In great spirits, he returns home after vacation and prepares to accept the advances of Sophie.

Cast
Ole Søltoft as Jacob Petersen, a 17-year-old searching for sexual experience. The role was a break-out performance for the 23-year-old Søltoft. Although he tried a few serious roles, he was quickly typecast in comedic sex romps. Through the late-60s and 70s, he went on to star in a successful series of Danish sex comedies before retiring from film in 1978.
Ghita Nørby as Vibeke
Emil Hass Christensen as Professor Petersen
Ole Monty as Jacob's Uncle
Bodil Steen as Jacob's Aunt
Lily Broberg as Mrs. Rosegod
Arthur Jensen as Konduktøren
Henry Nielsen as Stationsforstanderen
Annie Birgit Garde as Girl on Train
Susanne Heinrich as Hansigne
Ingolf David as Pharmacist
Jørgen Kiil as Dr. Irving Mogensen
Hugo Herrestrup as Knud
Lise Rosendahl as Sophie
Jytte Abildstrøm as Mrs. Steinkop

Reaction 
It had been more than ten years since the Danish public was indignant over the publication of Soya's novel as well as other controversial novels by Henry Miller and Agnar Mykle. By 1965, Danish attitudes had changed. In 1964, the state prosecutor had brought a pro forma obscenity case against the publishers of a new translation of Fanny Hill which ended in acquittal. Two years later, Denmark's laws against pornographic literature were repealed, and, in 1969, pictorial pornography was also decriminalized.

Reaction outside of Denmark was different and viewings were limited. In the United Kingdom, the British Board of Film Censors (BBFC) refused to certify Sytten for viewing in standard cinemas.  However, the final decision is always left to individual local authorities (which normally follow the BBFC's decisions).  Only in London, the Greater London Council permitted showings under an X-rating (for individuals aged 16 or over, at that time).

The film became an enormous box office success in Denmark, achieving a record profit of 3 million Danish kroner for the Palladium film studio. Palladium followed it the next year with a more serious work, Soya's Tagsten, also based upon a novel by Soya, however this film was a financial failure. After a few more attempts at more serious erotic films, Palladium finally discovered the correct formula was sex comedies with Ole Søltoft in the lead, such as Mazurka på sengekanten,. The film was the final production by Palladium, but it was another box-office hit, had many sequels and continued the wave of erotic comedies.

References

Further reading
Ebbe Villadsen: Danish Erotic Film Classics (2005)

External links
Sytten at IMDb
Sytten at Den Danske Film Database (in Danish)
Sytten at Det Danske Filminstitut (in Danish)

See also
Bedside-films
Zodiac-films

Danish sex comedy films
1950s Danish-language films
1956 films
1950s sex comedy films
Films based on Danish novels
Films shot in Denmark
Films set in Denmark
1956 comedy films